Oopterinus distinctus is a species of weevil in the family Curculionidae, in the order Coleoptera.
It was first recorded only within four counties in Arkansas when discovered in 1985, but has since been identified in additional counties in Arkansas as well as Louisiana and Alabama as of 2016.

References

Further reading
 Arnett, R.H. Jr., M. C. Thomas, P. E. Skelley and J. H. Frank. (eds.). (2002). American Beetles, Volume II: Polyphaga: Scarabaeoidea through Curculionoidea. CRC Press LLC, Boca Raton, FL.
 Poole, Robert W., and Patricia Gentili, eds. (1996). "Coleoptera". Nomina Insecta Nearctica: A Check List of the Insects of North America, vol. 1: Coleoptera, Strepsiptera, 41-820.
 Richard E. White. (1983). Peterson Field Guides: Beetles. Houghton Mifflin Company.
 Ross H. Arnett. (2000). American Insects: A Handbook of the Insects of America North of Mexico. CRC Press.

Curculioninae
Beetles described in 1985